Uroporphyrinogen III synthase is an enzyme involved in the metabolism of the cyclic tetrapyrrole compound porphyrin. It is involved in the conversion of hydroxymethyl bilane into uroporphyrinogen III. This enzyme catalyses the inversion of the final pyrrole unit (ring D) of the linear tetrapyrrole molecule, linking it to the first pyrrole unit (ring A), thereby generating a large macrocyclic structure, uroporphyrinogen III. The enzyme folds into two alpha/beta domains connected by a beta-ladder, the active site being located between the two domains.

Pathology

A deficiency is associated with Gunther's disease, also known as congenital erythropoietic porphyria (CEP). This is an autosomal recessive inborn error of metabolism that results from the markedly deficient activity of uroporphyrinogen III synthase.

References

External links
 

EC 4.2.1